George Neville, or Nevill, 4th and de jure 2nd Baron Bergavenny (c.1440 – 20 September 1492) was an English nobleman.

Career
George Neville was the son of Edward Neville, 3rd Baron Bergavenny and Elizabeth Beauchamp. He was knighted by Edward IV on 9 May 1471, after fighting for the King at the Battle of Tewkesbury. He succeeded his father in 1476.

Marriages and issue
Neville married firstly, before 1 May 1471, Margaret Fenn (d. 28 September 1485), the daughter and heiress of Hugh Fenn, by whom he had six sons and a daughter:

George Neville, 5th Baron Bergavenny (c. 1469 – c. 1535).
John Neville.
William Neville.
Sir Edward Neville (1471–1538), who married, before 6 April 1529, Eleanor (née Windsor), widow of Ralph Scrope, 9th Baron Scrope (d. 17 September 1515), and daughter of Andrew Windsor, 1st Baron Windsor. 
Sir Thomas Neville (c. 1484–1542), Speaker of the House of Commons, who married firstly Katherine Dacre, and secondly Elizabeth Bryce.
Sir Richard Neville (bef. 1485 – c. 1515).
Elizabeth Neville, who married firstly Thomas Berkeley, esquire, of Avon, Hampshire, and secondly Richard Covert, esquire, of Slaugham, Sussex.

He married secondly Elizabeth Brent. She was the widow successively of Richard Naylor, Sir Robert Basett, and John Stokker. There were no issue with his second marriage.

Bergavenny was a captain in the English forces at Calais in 1490, and died in 1492.

Ancestry

Notes

References

 

1440s births
1492 deaths
15th-century Welsh people
People of the Tudor period
George
Barons Bergavenny (Peerage of England)
English knights